Minuscule 429 (in the Gregory-Aland numbering), α 398 (in the Soden numbering), is a Greek minuscule manuscript of the New Testament, on cotton paper. Palaeographically it has been assigned to the 14th century (Apocalypse – 15th century).

Description 

The codex contains the text of the New Testament except Gospels on 204 paper leaves. It is written in one column per page, in 29 lines per page. The leaves are arranged in quarto. It contains Prolegomena and many marginal readings.

The order of books: Acts of the Apostles, Pauline epistles, Catholic epistles, and Book of Revelation.

It contains the Comma Johanneum added by a later hand.

Text 

The Greek text of the Acts of the Apostles and the Catholic epistles Aland placed in Category III. It exhibits a remarkable text. The text of the Pauline epistles and Apocalypse is a representative of the Byzantine text-type. Aland placed it in Category V. 
In the Pauline epistles, the text is close to the codices 206, 522, 1891, and 2815.

In Acts 12:25 it reads εξ Ιερουσαλημ εις Αντιοχειαν (from Jerusalem to Antioch) along with 945, 1739, e, p, syrp, copsa geo; majority reads εις Ιερουσαλημ (to Jerusalem);

In 2 Timothy 2:14 it reads Χριστου (of Christ) for θεοῦ (of God) along with 206, 1758.

History 

Acts and epistles were written by George, a monk in the 14th century (Scrivener 13th century). The Apocalypse was added later in the 14th or 15th century. 

The manuscript was examined by Franz Anton Knittel in 1773, Matthaei (designated by X), and Franz Delitsch. C. R. Gregory saw it in 1891. Formerly it was labelled by 69a, 74p, and 30r. In 1908 Gregory gave the number 429 to it.

The manuscript is currently housed at the Herzog August Bibliothek (Codd. Aug. Quarto 16.7.4) in Wolfenbüttel.

See also 

 List of New Testament minuscules
 Biblical manuscript
 Textual criticism

References

Further reading 

 Franz Anton Knittel, Beyträge zur Kritik über Johannes Offenbarung, Schröder, Braunschweig und Hildensheim 1773.

External links 

 Minuscule 429 at the Encyclopedia of Textual Criticism 

Greek New Testament minuscules
14th-century biblical manuscripts
15th-century biblical manuscripts
Herzog August Library